The title Hero of the Soviet Union was awarded over 12,000 times. 136 of the people awarded it were stripped of the title, of which 51 were later rehabilitated and returned the title. 16 recipients were executed.

Revoked and not restored

 Viktor Aleksandrov ru
 Vasily Anikovich ru
 Bronislav Antilevsky ru
 Georgy Antonov ru
 Nikolai Arsenev ru
 Nikolai Artamonov ru
 Fyodor Belesta ru
 Vladimir Bannykh ru
Vladimir Bobylyov ru
 Andrey Bykasov ru
 Semyon Bychkov
 Vasily Vanin ru
 Sergey Varentsov ru
 Georgy Vershinin ru
 Nikolai Vorobyov ru
 Lev Gitman ru
 Viktor Gladilin ru
 Fyodor Golubitsky ru
 Vasily Grigin ru
 Vasily Grichuk ru
 Ivan Dobrobabin ru
 Ivan Dunaev ru
 Pyotr Zolin ru
Valentin Ivanov ru
Sergey Ivanov ru
 Pavel Ivashkin ru
 Impanuil Ignatev ru
 Nikolai Kazakov ru
 Tishebai Karabaev ru
 Ivan Kilyushek ru
 Vasily Konkov ru
 Ivan Korovin ru
 Anton Kravchenko ru
 Pyotr Kuznetsov ru
 Nikolai Kukushkin ru
 Aleksey Kulak
 Nikolai Kulba ru
 Pyotr Kutsy ru
 Aleksey Lashko ru
 Yefim Lev ru
 Mikhail Lelyakin ru
 Nikolai Litvinenko ru
 Aleksandr Loginov ru
 Nikolai Loktionov ru
 Boris Lunin ru
 Vasily Lynnik ru
 Nikolai Magdik ru
 Nikolai Malyshev ru
 Ivan Medvedev ru
 Pyotr Mesnyakin ru
 Ivan Mironenko ru
 Semyon Mishustin ru
Aleksandr Morozov ru
 Anatoly Motsny
 Ivan Naumkin ru
 Mikhail Osipenko ru
 Sergey Panfyorov ru
 Vladimir Pasyukov ru
 Yegen Pilosyan ru
 Pyotr Poloz ru
 Aleksandr Postolyuk ru
 Kamal Pulatov ru
 Valentin Purgin ru
 Nikolai Rykhlin ru
 Nikolai Salomakhin ru
 Nikolai Severilov ru
 Ivan Serov
 Yegor Sidorenko ru
 Anatoly Sinkov ru
 Nikolai Skidin ru
 Grigory Sokl ru
 Yemelyan Sokol ru
 Anatoly Stanev ru
Nikolai Tokarev ru
 Eduard Tyakhe ru
 Mikhail Chebotkhov ru
 Edin Chernogoryuk ru
 Aleksey Chernogubov ru
 Pyotr Chizhikov ru
 Grigory Chirkov ru
 Aleksandr Shapovalov ru
 Aleksandr Shilkov ru
 Dmitry Shtoda ru
 Vladimir Yusupov ru
 Vasily Yashin ru

Revoked, but later restored

 Viktor Agienko ru
 Nikolai Aleksandrov ru
 Valentin Andrusenko ru
Nikolai Antonov ru
 Nikifor Afanasev ru
 Leonid Baklanov ru
 Aleksey Blinov ru
 Pyotr Braiko
 Iosif Burshik ru
Mikhail Vasilyev ru
 Filipp Gerasimov ru
 Vasily Gordov
 Mikhail Grabsky
 Nikolai Davidovich ru
 Khansultan Dachiev
 Nikifor Yevtushenko ru
 Pyotr Yefimov ru
Aleksandr Ivanov ru
 Viktor Ilchenko ru
 Ivan Kondratev ru
 Grigory Koptilov ru
 Mikhail Kossa ru
 Aleksandr Krivets ru
Vladimir Kryukov
 Nikolai Kudryashov ru
 Grigory Kulik
 Zamakhshyari Kunizhev ru
 Konstantin Lebedev ru
 Gavriil Lepyokhin ru
 David Margulis ru
 Arnold Meri
 Vasily Merkushev ru
 Ivan Mozgovoy ru
Vladimir Morozov ru
 Pavel Nesterenko ru
 Aleksandr Novikov
Dmitry Pavlov
 Ivan Primakin ru
 Ivan Proskurov
 Yevgeny Ptukhin
 Pyotr Pumpur
 Pavel Rychagov
 Vladimir Saprykin
 Yakov Smushkevich
 Mikhail Sysoev ru
 Makar Tkachyov ru
 Andrey Frolov ru
 Ivan Chernets ru
 Ernst Shakht
 Vladimir Shevchenko ru
 Grigory Shtern

References 

 
 Russian Ministry of Defence Database «Подвиг Народа в Великой Отечественной войне 1941—1945 гг.» [Feat of the People in the Great Patriotic War 1941-1945] (in Russian).

Heroes of the Soviet Union lists